Don Edward Glover (born April 1944) is an American politician who was a member of the Arkansas House of Representatives from the 11th district in Chicot County.

Political career

Election
Glover was elected in the general election on November 6, 2018, winning 44 percent of the vote over 31 percent of Independent candidate Mark McElroy.

References

External links

Glover, Don
Living people
21st-century American politicians
1944 births